James Robert Pender (3 July 1877 – 2 July 1916) was an Australian rules footballer who played with Carlton Football Club in the Victorian Football League (VFL).

Family
The son of Michael Pender, and Mary Anne Pender, née O'Dowd, James Robert Pender was born in North Melbourne, Victoria (then known as "Hotham") on 3 July 1877.

His three brothers — Michael "Mick" Pender (1868-1924) (Carlton), Daniel Emmett "Dan" Pender (1873-1968) (Carlton), and Peter Lawrence John Aloysius "Laurie" Pender (1887-1966) (Geelong) — all played VFL football.

He married Minne Ethel Harvey (1882-1959) in 1900. Their son, James Michael "Jim" Pender (1911-1985), played one First XVIII match for Geelong in 1936.

Football
Pender played for the Wellington Football Club in the Geelong Junior football Association, and briefly played for Geelong during the latter part of the 1896 VFA season.

In 1898 he received a permit to play with Carlton and he played 15 games with the Carlton First XVIII that year.

Military service
He enlisted in the First AIF on 9 July 1915.

Death
He was killed in action, in France, on 2 July 1916.

On 2 July 1916, while serving as the batman of Second Lieutenant Robert David Julian, and having been told that his officer (and good friend) Julian had been shot while in charge of a party raiding the German trenches, impaled upon barbed wire in "no man's Land", and very possibly dead, and that the others (also wounded) fighting with him had been able to bring him back to the Australian lines, Pender went out to find him and bring him back.

Pender did not return to the Australian lines, and was never seen again (and neither was Julian).

Pender was declared "missing in action" in July 1916; and was officially declared "killed in action on 2 July 1916" in 1917.

Memorial
He has no grave. His death is commemorated at the Villers–Bretonneux Australian National Memorial.

See also
 List of Victorian Football League players who died in active service

Footnotes

References
 
  Holmesby, Russell; Main, Jim (2014). The Encyclopedia of AFL Footballers: every AFL/VFL player since 1897 (10th ed.). Melbourne, Victoria: Bas Publishing. 
 Main, J. & Allen, D., "Pender, Jim", pp. 147–149 in Main, J. & Allen, D., Fallen – The Ultimate Heroes: Footballers Who Never Returned From War, Crown Content, (Melbourne), 2002. 
 Tapner, Warren, "The Great Fallen: James Pender", The Blueseum, 21 April 2015.
 World War One Service Record: Private James Robert Pender (3458), National Archives of Australia.
 Roll of Honour: Private James Robert Pender (3458), Australian War Memorial.
 World War One Nominal Roll: Private James Robert Pender (3458), Collection of the Australian War Memorial.
 Australian Red Cross Society Wounded and Missing Enquiry Bureau files, 1914-18 War: 1DRL/0428: 3458 Private James Robert Pender: 14th Battalion, Collection of the Australian War Memorial.

External links

 
 Jim Pender, at Blueseum.

1877 births
1916 deaths
Australian rules footballers from Melbourne
Geelong Football Club (VFA) players
Carlton Football Club players
East Perth Football Club players
Australian military personnel killed in World War I
Missing in action of World War I
People from North Melbourne
Military personnel from Melbourne